The Cowboy and the Lady may refer to:

Films:
The Cowboy and the Lady (1911 film), starring Alan Hale Sr.
The Cowboy and the Lady (1915 film), with S. Miller Kent and Helen Case
The Cowboy and the Lady (1922 film), starring Mary Miles Minter and Thomas J. Moore
The Cowboy and the Lady (1938 film), featuring Gary Cooper and Merle Oberon

Albums:
The Cowboy and the Lady, an album collaboration by Lee Hazlewood and Ann-Margret

Songs:
"The Cowboy and the Lady", original title of "The Cowgirl and the Dandy", a 1977 song written by Bobby Goldsboro